Terence Norman Martin (22 July 1918 – September 2001) was an Australian politician.

He was born in Glenorchy, Tasmania. In 1964 he was elected to the Tasmanian House of Assembly as a Labor member for Franklin. He held the seat until he was defeated in 1969. His son, also named Terry, was a member of the Tasmanian Legislative Council from 2004 to 2010.

References

1918 births
2001 deaths
Members of the Tasmanian House of Assembly
Australian Labor Party members of the Parliament of Tasmania
20th-century Australian politicians